Jeffery Smith is the name of

 Jeffery Smith (athlete) (born 1943), Zambian sprinter
 Jeffery Smith (musician) (1955-2012), American jazz singer

See also
Jeff Smith (disambiguation)
Geoff Smith (disambiguation)
Geoffrey Smith (disambiguation)
Jefferson Smith (disambiguation)